Taraana is a 1979 Hindi movie produced by Tarachand Barjatya for Rajshri Productions. The film stars Mithun Chakravorty, Ranjeeta, Bhagwan Dada, Om Shivpuri, Jagdeep, Shreeram Lagoo, Jayshree T., Urmila Bhatt and Sharat Saxena. The film's music is by Vijay Patil, also known as Raam Laxman.

Cast
Mithun Chakraborty as Shyam
Ranjeeta Kaur as Radha
Bhagwan Dada
Dr. Shreeram Lagoo
Om Shivpuri
Jagdeep
Jayshree T.
Sharat Saxena
Urmila Bhatt

Soundtrack

All the songs  were composed by Music Director Raamlaxman and lyrics were penned by Ravindra Rawal and Tilakraj Thapar.

References

https://web.archive.org/web/20101203191014/http://www.jointscene.com/movies/bollywood/Tarana%20-%201979/12198

External links 
 

1979 films
1970s Hindi-language films
Rajshri Productions films
Films scored by Raamlaxman
Films directed by Deepak Bahry